Campichthys galei (Gale's pipefish) is a species of marine fish of the family Syngnathidae. It is endemic to Australia, found from Shark Bay (Western Australia) to the Spencer Gulf (South Australia) on the rubble bottom of inshore waters to depths of 18m. This species is ovoviviparous, with the males carrying eggs in a brood pouch until they are ready to hatch.

References

Further reading

Atlas of Living Australia
Australian Government Department of the Environment and Energy

galei
Marine fish
Fish described in 1909